Kurush Deboo (born 12 September 1963) is an Indian actor who has acted in many supporting roles in Hindi films and television series. He was first noticed as Shah Rukh Khan's character's loyal friend in Kabhi Haan Kabhi Naa. He is known for his role as Dr. Rustom Pavri in Munnabhai M.B.B.S.

Early life
Kurush Deboo was born on 12 September 1963 in Mumbai in a Parsi family. He grew up in Navsari in Gujarat. He had completed his BCom in Navsari in 1984. He moved to Mumbai and completed Diploma in Advertising and Marketing from Xavier's Institute of Communications, Mumbai in 1986 and Diploma in Marketing Management from Jamnalal Bajaj Institute of Management Studies in 1987.

He received a diploma in acting from Roshan Taneja's Actors Studio in 1988.

Career 
Deboo made a debut in the NFDC produced Gujarati film Percy  (1989) which earned critical acclaim and a nomination for the Best Actor in National Awards 1990. He acted as Tehmul in Such A Long Journey (1998) and he was nominated for the Best Supporting Actor in Genie Awards 1999.

He has acted in many Hindi films; Kabhi Haan Kabhi Naa (1993), Page 3 (2005), Taxi No. 9211 (2006), Apne (2007), Jhankaar Beats (2003), Kasoor (2001), Bhoothnath Returns (2014), My Friend Ganesha 2 (2008), Lage Raho Munna Bhai (2006). His performance as Dr. Rustom Pavri in superhit film Munna Bhai M.B.B.S. (2003) brought him popularity and critical acclaim. He has also acted in Little Zizou (2008). In 2010s he acted in some Gujarati films including Vitamin She (2016).

He has also acted in many TV Series: Ek Nayi Ummeed - Roshni as Roshni's father Dr. Anand Singh, Jeannie Aur Juju as Doctor Doctor, Adalat, Zindagi Khatti Meethi, Ishq Kills, Maniben.com, Aashiq Biwi Ka, Four, Shaka Laka Boom Boom, Banegi Apni Baat, Bible Ki Kahaniya, Chanakya and Bombay Blue.

Filmography

Films

Television

Web series

References

External links 
 

Indian male film actors
Living people
Male actors in Hindi cinema
21st-century Indian male actors
Male actors from Mumbai
Male actors in Hindi television
Indian male television actors
1963 births
Parsi people from Mumbai
People from Navsari district
University of Mumbai alumni
Jamnalal Bajaj Institute of Management Studies alumni
Male actors in Telugu cinema